Albert G. Pendleton (January 30, 1809 – 1875) was a nineteenth-century American politician from Virginia. Pendleton served multiple terms in the Virginia House of Delegates and was elected to the Virginia Constitutional Convention of 1850.

Early life
Pendleton was born in Culpeper County, Virginia in 1809. He entered the United States Military Academy in 1825, but left on account of illness.

Career

As an adult, Pendleton settled in Tazewell County, Virginia and began a law practice. Later he was appointed Commonwealth’s Attorney there.

In 1833, Pendleton moved to Giles County and served in the Virginia House of Delegates from Giles in the 1840s sessions of 1843/44, 1845/46, and 1849/50.

In 1850, Pendleton was elected to the Virginia Constitutional Convention of 1850. He was one of three delegates elected from the transmontane delegate district made up of his home district of Giles County as well as Mercer, Tazewell, and Monroe Counties.

In the 1850s, Pendleton was elected to the House of Delegates from Giles and Mercer Counties for the session 1855/56, declined Democratic nomination for Lieutenant Governor in 1855, and was a presidential elector in 1856.

Then following the American Civil War, Pendleton was reelected a Delegate for the sessions 1865/66 and 1866/67 during Virginia’s Presidential Reconstruction.

Death
Albert G. Pendleton died in Giles County, Virginia in 1875.

References

Bibliography

Democratic Party members of the Virginia House of Delegates
1809 births
1875 deaths
People from Culpeper County, Virginia
People from Tazewell County, Virginia
People from Giles County, Virginia
County and city Commonwealth's Attorneys in Virginia
19th-century American politicians
Pendleton family